Jehan Desanges (3 January 1929 – 23 March 2021) was a French historian, philologist and epigrapher, a specialist in the topic of North Africa during Antiquity.

Biography 
Desanges was born in Nantes. He graduated in 1953, and was a lecturer at the École des hautes études in Tunis from 1958 to 1959. He was chef de travaux, then assistant professor of ancient history at the University of Dakar between 1959 and 1963. He was in charge of teaching in ancient history at the University of Algiers between 1963 and 1964 and at University of Nantes between 1964 and 1976, before becoming a senior lecturer after the defense of his thesis in 1976. From 1983 to 2001, he was director of studies at École pratique des hautes études, VI Section, then director of pensioned studies.

Member, then President, of Comité des travaux historiques et scientifiques, member of Société des Antiquaires de France, former head of the Interuniversity Network of Studies on Ancient North Africa and Medieval Islam. A former member of the National Council of Universities, the Scientific Council and the Board of Trustees of the French School of Rome, of the Scientific Council of Institut Français d'Archéologie Orientale. He was also a member, then president, of the scientific council of Aouras magazine, member of the Scientific Council and the Editorial Board of the Encyclopédie berbère as well as of the Editorial Board of the Graeco-Arabica series (Athens).

A member of the Institute for Advanced Study in Princeton, Jehan Desanges was a Research Fellow at Princeton University then visiting Fellow at the University of Cincinnati in 2004. A corresponding member of the Académie des Inscriptions et Belles-Lettres from 2000 onwards, he was elected a full member on 4 May 2012 in the seat formerly held by Claude Nicolet. He died in Paris, aged 92.

Honours

Main publications 
1962: Catalogue Des tribus africaines de l'Antiquité classique à l'ouest du Nil, éd. Publications de la section d'histoire de l'université de Dakar
1978: Recherches sur l'activité des Méditerranéens aux confins de l'Afrique (VIe siècle avant J-C. – IVe siècle après J.-C.), éd. Collection de l'École française de Rome
1980: Pline l'Ancien, histoire naturelle, 1-46 (L'Afrique du Nord), texte établi, traduit et commenté, éd. Les Belles Lettres, Paris
1988: Les Routes millénaires (in collaboration with M. Mollat du Jourdin), éd. Nathan, Paris
1993: Sur les routes antiques de l’Azanie et de l’Inde. Le Fonds Révoil du musée de l'Homme (Heïs et Damo, en Somalie) (in collaboration with E.M. Stern and P. Ballet), éd. l'Académie des inscriptions et belles-lettres, nouvelle série, XIII, Paris
1999: Toujours Afrique apporte fait nouveau. Scripta minora, éd. Boccard, Paris
2008: Pline l’Ancien, histoire naturelle, Livre VI, 4e partie (L’Asie africaine sauf l’Égypte, les dimensions et les climats du monde habité), texte établi, traduit et commenté, éd. Les Belles Lettres, Paris
2010: La Nouvelle Carte des voies romaines de l’Est de l’Africa dans l’Antiquité tardive d’après les travaux de P. Salama (Direction with Claude Lepelley and Noël Duval), éd. Brepols, Turnhout

References 

 

20th-century French historians
21st-century French historians
French philologists
French epigraphers
Academic staff of the École pratique des hautes études
Chevaliers of the Légion d'honneur
Officers of the Ordre national du Mérite
Commandeurs of the Ordre des Palmes Académiques
Members of the Académie des Inscriptions et Belles-Lettres
Writers from Nantes
1929 births
2021 deaths